Pope Gelasius II (c. 1060/1064 – 29 January 1119), born Giovanni Caetani or Giovanni da Gaeta (also called Coniulo), was head of the Catholic Church and ruler of the Papal States from 24 January 1118 to his death in 1119. A monk of Monte Cassino and chancellor of Pope Paschal II, Caetani was unanimously elected to succeed him. In doing so, he also inherited the conflict with Emperor Henry V over investiture. Gelasius spent a good part of his brief papacy in exile.

Biography

Early life
He was born between 1060 and 1064 at Gaeta into the Pisan branch of the Caetani family, and he became a monk of Monte Cassino. Pope Urban II, who wished to improve the style of papal documents, brought him to Rome and made Caetani a papal subdeacon (August 1088) and cardinal deacon of Santa Maria in Cosmedin (probably on 23 September 1088). As chancellor of the Holy Roman Church from 1089 to 1118, he drastically reformed the papal administration, establishing a permanent staff of clerks for the papacy, overcoming the previous custom of relying on Roman notaries to write papal documents, and introducing the minuscule curial script. His tenure also established the precedent of the papal chancellor always being a cardinal and holding the office for life or until elected pope.

Pontificate
Shortly after his unanimous election to succeed Pope Paschal II in 1118, he was seized by Cencio II Frangipane, a partisan of Emperor Henry V, but was freed by a general uprising of the Romans on his behalf.

Henry V sought to enforce the privilege of investiture conceded (and later revoked in 1112) by the papacy, under duress, by Paschal II. He drove Gelasius II from Rome in March 1118, pronounced his election null and void, and set up Maurice Bourdin, Archbishop of Braga, as antipope under the name of Gregory VIII.

Gelasius II fled to Gaeta, where he was ordained a priest on 9 March 1118 and on the following day received episcopal consecration. He at once excommunicated Henry V and the antipope and, under Norman protection, was able to return to Rome in July. But the disturbances of the imperialist party, especially those of the Frangipani, who attacked the Pope while celebrating Mass in the church of St. Prassede, compelled Gelasius II to go once more into exile. He set out for France, consecrating the cathedral of Pisa on the way, and arrived at Marseille in October. He was received with great enthusiasm at Avignon, Montpellier and other cities, held a synod at Vienne in January 1119, and was planning to hold a general council to settle the investiture contest when he died at the Abbey of Cluny.

See also

List of popes

Notes

References

1060s births
1119 deaths
Popes
Cardinals created by Pope Urban II
Italian popes
People from Gaeta
Burials at Cluny Abbey
House of Caetani
12th-century popes